Dwell Among Us is the debut gospel CD by Byron Cage & Purpose.  Recorded in 1995, this live album produced contemporary worship music standards "Dwell Among Us", "The Blood" and "The Glory Song".

Track listing

Byron Cage albums
1995 live albums